Elle Evans Bellamy (born Lindsey Gayle Evans; December 9, 1989) is an American model and actress who lives and works in Los Angeles.  She appeared in the music video for "Blurred Lines". She is also one of the faces of NYX Cosmetics.

Early life
Lindsey Gayle Evans (later known as Elle Evans) was born on December 9, 1989 in Paris, Texas and grew up in Blanchard, Louisiana. She studied at Northwood High School and attended Northwestern State University, where she majored in broadcast journalism.

Evans is a former pageant titleholder who held the Miss Louisiana Teen USA 2008. Evans also competed in the Miss Teen USA 2008 pageant, where she was third runner-up. However, she was stripped of her state title after eleven months following her arrest over an incident in a restaurant, where marijuana was found in her purse, and she and three friends were accused of not paying their bill. 

Immediately after the much publicized arrest, Evans was asked to pose as a centerfold for Playboy. At the age of 19, she became Playboy Playmate of the Month for October 2009 under her full, legal name, Lindsey Gayle Evans. Her pictorial was photographed by Stephen Wayda.

Career
In 2010, Evans was cast by MMG in her first commercial. It was shot in China, and she appeared in it styled to look like Marilyn Monroe. The commercial aired all throughout Shanghai.

Evans is represented by United Talent Agency as well as Wilhelmina Models in Miami, Florida. Elle is managed by 3 Arts Entertainment and represented commercially by Agency for the Performing Arts. In 2013, she appeared bare-breasted in Robin Thicke's music video for his single "Blurred Lines", featuring Pharrell Williams. The music video generated over 600 million views and made the "Texas-born model part of a pop culture phenomenon." Shortly after that, Evans was cast in two of Beyoncé's music videos: "Haunted" and "Superpower". Both videos were directed by Jonas Akerlund in 2013.

Evans, one of the faces of NYX Cosmetics, appeared in Kmart's 2013 national ad campaign "Money Can't Buy Style", was featured in Relapse Magazine's 2013 and 2014 Photo Annual Issue, and starred in an AXE Apollo Cologne commercial that aired during the 2013 MTV Movie Awards.

Evans modeled for Samuel Bayer. She was shot fully nude, along with 15 other models, for Bayer's exhibition "Diptychs & Triptychs". The black-and-white series of 6-foot-tall diptychs and 12-foot-tall triptychs was "to capture beauty in its most vulnerable state", and was on view at the ACE Gallery in Beverly Hills from March 2013 to April 2013.

In 2014, she guest starred in an episode of Two and a Half Men, which originally aired on February 6, 2014. Also in February, she landed the cover of FHM France. Then in September she was featured in an issue of Maxim for their "Golden Girl" spread celebrating the 50th anniversary of the film Goldfinger, where she was painted gold from head to toe.

That same year, Evans was cast in a Wet 'n Wild cosmetics commercial shot by director David LaChapelle titled "Steal the Look", in addition to landing two national ads for Mary Kay Cosmetics which aired during the premiere of the thirteenth season of Project Runway on Lifetime in November 2014.

In 2015, Evans appeared in another music video, this time for the band Muse and their single, "Mercy". The video was directed by Sing J Lee and was released in June.

In September 2015 Evans was cast in a Carl's Jr. commercial for their new "Tex Mex Bacon-Thickburger". Donning a patriotic bikini to represent the ladies of Team USA, Evans faces off in a volleyball game against model Alejandra Guilmant and Team Mexico to determine if the burger is "More Tex, or more Mex." The commercial, aired on September 28.

Shortly after that, Evans appeared as Amber in the film Scouts Guide to the Zombie Apocalypse (2015) directed by Christopher Landon, and as Star in the horror-thriller film The Love Witch, which was directed by Anna Biller.

Personal life
Evans started dating Matt Bellamy, the lead singer and guitarist of the band Muse in February 2015. In December 2017, they announced their engagement. On August 10, 2019, Bellamy and Evans got married. 

In February 2020, Evans announced on her Instagram account that she and Bellamy were expecting their first baby together for late May 2020. On June 13 the couple announced the birth of their daughter.

References

Further reading
 "Elle Evans Model, Actress and 'IT' Girl in Hit Music Video 'Blurred Lines, diamonds.net, Rapaport Magazine, Retrieved January 2014
 Ones to Watch - Rebel Issue - Elle Evans: Robin Thicke's Blurred Lines, XEX Mag. January 2014 Issue, Retrieved 2014
 Celebrity Beauty Secrets: 'Blurred Lines' Video Vixen, Elle Evans, BeautyWorldNews.com, November 2013, Retrieved January 2014
 Elle Evans - Blurred Lines - Interview, Starry Constellation Magazine, 2013, Retrieved January 2014
 'Blurred Lines' Vixen Going Places, Miami Herald, October 2013, Retrieved January 2014
 Exclusive ITW: Elle Evans of Blurred Lines: A Conversation We Needed to Have, Her Report, October 2013, Retrieved February 2014

External links
Elle Evans official website
 

1989 births
Living people
21st-century American actresses
Actresses from Louisiana
Actresses from Texas
Female models from Texas
American people of English descent
American people of Dutch descent
American television actresses
Beauty pageant contestants from Louisiana
Northwestern State University alumni
People from Paris, Texas
People from Blanchard, Louisiana
2000s Playboy Playmates